The FM H-16-44 was a diesel-electric locomotive produced by Fairbanks-Morse from April 1950 – February 1963. The H-16-44 was configured in a B-B wheel arrangement, mounted atop a pair of two-axle AAR Type-B road trucks with all axles powered. In late 1950, the AAR trucks were almost exclusively replaced with the same units found on the company's "C-liner" locomotives.

As with many of their F–M contemporaries, the H-16-44s produced through 1954 featured numerous Raymond Loewy design touches, in this case largely manifested in the form of sloping body lines and a noticeable protrusion in the long hood around the radiator shutters. Cab side window units include inoperable "half moon"-shaped panes, resulting in an oblong-shaped assembly. To reduce manufacturing costs, the curved window panes were eliminated from later models, and from 1953 onward the raised, elongated headlight mounting was omitted. Units built in the "Spartanized" fashion can be spotted by their straight ends, coupled with the lack of superfluous trim. Ventilation slots were added at the battery box to reduce the possibility of explosions. The final production phase, which commenced in March 1955, turned out units that most closely resembled the Fairbanks–Morse "Train Master" series.

209 were built for American railroads, 58 were manufactured from March 1955 – June 1957 by the Canadian Locomotive Company for use in Canada, and 32 units were exported to Mexico. Three intact examples of the H-16-44 are known to survive today; one is ex-Canadian Pacific 8554, property of a Canadian railroad historical society, FNM (ex-CHP) 602 at the National Rail Museum in Puebla, Mexico, formerly displayed at the Chihuahua al Pacífico shops in Mexico, and ex-CHP 525 on display at Nuevo Casas Grandes in Chihuahua, Mexico. The shell of CHP 524 is on display as part of a memorial at Temoris, Mexico.

Units produced by Fairbanks-Morse (1950–1963)

Units produced by the Canadian Locomotive Company (1955–1957)

References

Further reading

External links
 Fairbanks-Morse H16-44 Roster
 Preserved Fairbanks Morse Four-Axle Road Switchers
 Canadian Pacific Railway CLC Locomotives

B-B locomotives
H-16-44
CLC locomotives
Railway locomotives introduced in 1950
Diesel-electric locomotives of the United States
Freight locomotives
Standard gauge locomotives of the United States
Standard gauge locomotives of Canada
Diesel-electric locomotives of Canada